Dan Thurlow (born 1947) is a Colorado politician and former member of the Colorado House of Representatives from the 55th District, which encompasses the Mesa County communities of Clifton, Fruitvale, Grand Junction, Orchard Mesa, and Redlands.

Thurlow, a Republican, is from Grand Junction. Although his legislative website lists his occupation as "Business owner," at least one news report indicates Thurlow sold his business.

Elections
 In 2014, Thurlow won the Republican primary and then went on to defeat his Democratic opponent in the general election, winning 66.5% of the vote.
 In 2016, Thurlow did not face any opposition in the primary or in the general election and was re-elected.
 In 2018, Thurlow ran for State Senate but lost in the primary.

References

External links
 Campaign website
 State House website

21st-century American politicians
Living people
Republican Party members of the Colorado House of Representatives
Colorado State University alumni
People from Grand Junction, Colorado
1947 births